Derek Brown (born 1944 or 1945) is a British food writer and was editor of the Michelin Red Guides; the first non-French person to do so.

Brown attended a hotel school then worked hotel front desks and in restaurants, then became a Michelin Guide reviewer in his early 30s.

He appeared as a castaway on the BBC Radio programme Desert Island Discs on 25 May 2003.

References 

Year of birth missing (living people)
Place of birth missing (living people)
1940s births
Living people
British food writers
British book editors
Michelin Guide